Irma Segunda Amaya Echeverría (born 28 June 1961) is a Salvadoran feminist, human rights activist, former guerrilla fighter, and politician. She was a member of the Legislative Assembly of El Salvador and the first Salvadoran woman President of the Central American Parliament (PARLACEN) for the term 2018–2019.

She is currently Central American Deputy for the State of El Salvador for her second consecutive term and National Women's Secretary of the Farabundo Martí National Liberation Front (FMLN)

Early life
Irma Amaya joined the basic ecclesial communities (BECs) in the late 1970s. Subsequently, she joined the Fuerzas Populares de Liberación Farabundo Martí (FPL), one of the five armed organizations that formed the FMLN guerrillas in 1980. During the Salvadoran Civil War, she adopted the nom de guerre Carolina, and lived in hiding until the signing of the Chapultepec Peace Accords.

Career
In 1992 she founded the Mélida Anaya Montes Women's Movement Association (Las Mélidas) within the framework of the Peace Accords, and has been an activist for the organization ever since. She was president of its board of directors for the term 2015–2019.

Amaya was a national deputy of the Legislative Assembly of El Salvador for three consecutive terms, from 1997 to 2009, joining the Justice and Human Rights Commission and the Electoral and Constitutional Reforms Commission. She was also a legislative advisor on gender and women's rights from 2009 to 2011.

She earned a licentiate in legal sciences from the Universidad Nueva San Salvador in 2013.

She served as president ad honorem of the government's Injured and Disabled Protection Fund (FOPROLYD) for two consecutive terms, from 2009 to 2019. She was initially appointed by President Mauricio Funes, and ratified during the term of Salvador Sánchez Cerén. Under her management, FOPROLYD made a payment on the historical debt that the Salvadoran state owed the beneficiary population from 1993 to 1995, giving said cancellation to 46 beneficiaries, for a total amount of $92,528.60.

A PARLACEN deputy elected for two consecutive terms, from 2011 to 2021, Amaya has served as president of the Committee on International Relations and Migration Affairs (2016–2017), secretary of the Board of Directors (2017–2018), and president of the Board of Directors (2018–2019), becoming the first Salvadoran woman to hold the latter post. She was elected to it with the widest margin of votes in the history of the regional forum.

She is a founder and member of the FMLN, and served as its Deputy National Secretary from 2001 to 2002 and Municipal Secretary of Santa Tecla from 2015 to 2019. In 2019 she became its National Women's Secretary, with a term ending in 2024.

Her daughter, Cristina Cornejo, was elected to the Legislative Assembly in 2018.

References

External links
 

1961 births
Farabundo Martí National Liberation Front politicians
Living people
Members of the Legislative Assembly of El Salvador
People of the Salvadoran Civil War
Salvadoran feminists
21st-century Salvadoran women politicians
21st-century Salvadoran politicians
Presidents of Central American Parliament